Terence McDermott (born 8 December 1951) is an English former football midfielder who was a member of the Liverpool team of the 1970s and early 1980s, in which he won three European Cups and five First Division titles. He was capped 25 times for England, and has had an extensive coaching career with Newcastle United (twice), Huddersfield Town and more recently, as assistant manager of Birmingham City.

Playing career

Early career
McDermott joined Bury as a youngster in 1969. He made a total of 90 appearances and eight goals before joining Newcastle United in 1973.

Manager Joe Harvey gave McDermott his Newcastle debut on 17 March 1973, at Old Trafford against Manchester United. He came off the bench but could not do anything to prevent Newcastle losing 2–1.

McDermott reached the FA Cup Final in 1974 against Liverpool. However, Newcastle lost the match 3–0.

Liverpool
Liverpool boss Bob Paisley, in his first season in charge after replacing Bill Shankly, brought McDermott to Merseyside in November 1974. McDermott made his Liverpool debut on 16 November, as did Phil Neal, in a Merseyside derby against Everton at Goodison Park. Neither side could break the deadlock with both sides sharing the points. McDermott's first goal came in a 1–1 league draw with Burnley at Turf Moor on 8 March 1975.

For the next two years, McDermott struggled to get into the team or hold down a place once given his chance. Liverpool won the League championship and the UEFA Cup in the 1975–76 season but McDermott did not play in enough matches to pick up a League medal, although he was in the squad which won in Europe. Speculation mounted that he would move on in the summer of 1976, but instead he stayed at Anfield and became an integral part of the following season's triumphs.

McDermott was a fixture in the 1977 side that retained the title. Meanwhile, his goal against Everton in the semi-final of the FA Cup, a turn and chip from the edge of the penalty area, was voted the 'Goal of the Season' by the BBC. That game finished 2–2, with Liverpool winning the replay. A subsequent success in a European Cup semi-final meant that Liverpool had reached the finals of both the FA Cup and European Cup, which were scheduled to be played respectively at Wembley and at Rome's Stadio Olimpico within four days of each other in May 1977. However, Liverpool were defeated in the FA Cup Final by Manchester United, which ended their "treble" dream. There was joy for McDermott four days later, though, when he opened the scoring in the European Cup Final against Borussia Mönchengladbach as Liverpool won 3–1.

On 6 December 1977, he scored a hat-trick in the second leg of Liverpool's victory over Hamburg in the UEFA Super Cup Final.

Liverpool reached their first League Cup final in 1978 and this occasion was to prove memorable for McDermott for the wrong reasons. The first game at Wembley against Nottingham Forest ended goalless, but McDermott had a goal disallowed after the officials decided that Kenny Dalglish was in an offside position when McDermott struck his shot. In the replay at Old Trafford, after Forest had opened the scoring with a hotly disputed penalty, McDermott scored what he thought was the equaliser with a well-struck drive, only for the officials to deny him again, claiming he had controlled the pass with his arm. Forest held on to win 1–0 and McDermott offered to swear on oath in an after-match interview that he had trapped the ball legally with his chest.

Consolation at missing out on the League Cup was found at the end of the season when McDermott featured in the Liverpool team which retained the European Cup thanks to a 1–0 win over Club Brugge at Wembley.

The following season, McDermott scored one of Liverpool's most memorable goals. It came at Anfield in a League match against Tottenham Hotspur on 2 September 1978. Liverpool were defending a corner which was cleared from their own penalty area to striker David Johnson, who hit a long pass to the sprinting winger Steve Heighway on the left flank as McDermott started to chase forward. Within just a few seconds, the ball was in the Spurs net as Heighway raced down the line and crossed the ball, without stopping to control it, for McDermott to head home after a 70-yard run. This was the final goal in a 7–0 win.

By the end of that season, McDermott and Liverpool were champions again and they retained the title in 1980, with McDermott being voted the PFA Players' Player of the Year and the FWA Footballer of the Year - the first player to win both awards in the same season. He scored another memorable goal against Tottenham that season, this time in the FA Cup at White Hart Lane, when he took a misplaced pass from Osvaldo Ardiles on the right hand corner of the penalty area, flicked the ball into the air and hit a lob-volley into the far corner of the goal.

In 1981, McDermott featured as Liverpool beat West Ham United after a replay to win the League Cup for the first time. Later that season, he appeared in the team that defeated Real Madrid in the European Cup Final. A further League title and League Cup followed in 1982 but his place in the side was becoming less assured.

Later career
McDermott returned to Newcastle United in September 1982. At Newcastle, he featured alongside his former Liverpool teammate Kevin Keegan and youngsters Chris Waddle and Peter Beardsley as Newcastle won promotion back to the top flight of English football in 1984.

McDermott left Newcastle in January 1985 and moved abroad to play with Cork City in Ireland.

From 1985 to 1987, McDermott played for the Cypriot team APOEL alongside Ian Moores, where he won the Cypriot Championship and the Cypriot Super Cup.

International career
On 7 September 1977, Ron Greenwood gave McDermott his debut for England in a 0–0 friendly draw with Switzerland at Wembley. He opened his goalscoring account on 10 September 1980 during a World Cup qualifier at Wembley against Norway. McDermott scored twice, including a penalty, as England won 4–0.

McDermott was selected for the England squad which travelled to the 1980 European Championships in Italy. He played in two of the group games.

McDermott was also picked for the England squad for the 1982 World Cup in Spain but did not play, despite having featured in every qualifying game. He never played for England again and only featured as a substitute in one match for Liverpool the following season.

In his England career, he had been capped 25 times at senior level, and scored three goals.

Coaching career
When Kevin Keegan became manager of Newcastle on 5 February 1992, he recruited McDermott as his first team coach. Together the two masterminded a return to the top of the English game for Newcastle which included a close run to the League title in 1996 which was won by Manchester United. After Keegan resigned, McDermott stayed at Newcastle for a further season under Kenny Dalglish but left Newcastle when Dalglish resigned and replacement Ruud Gullit decided to bring in his own coach.

When John Barnes was appointed as head coach of Celtic on 8 June 1999, he appointed McDermott as assistant head coach alongside Eric Black, before they were all sacked following the Scottish Cup defeat by Inverness Caledonian Thistle in February 2000.

In 2005, McDermott returned to Newcastle after he was recruited by manager Graeme Souness to work as a coach. After the sacking of Souness in February 2006, McDermott stayed on under managers Glenn Roeder, Sam Allardyce and Keegan once again.

When Keegan quit in September 2008, McDermott also left along with Adam Sadler. On 19 December 2008, McDermott was named assistant manager of League One side Huddersfield Town, effectively becoming Lee Clark's right-hand man. Following the sacking of Clark in February 2012, McDermott was also sacked. In June 2012 he joined Birmingham City as Clark's assistant. On 17 February 2014, it was widely reported that he and first-team coach Derek Fazackerley had left Birmingham; the club stated they had "no comment to issue on the matter at this moment in time".

Personal life
McDermott's sons Neale and Greg also played football, formerly on the books of Gateshead F.C. He also has a daughter Rachel.

.
On 22 August 2021, he announced that he had been diagnosed with dementia.

Career statistics

Club

Managerial statistics

Honours
Newcastle United
 Texaco Cup: 1973–74
 Anglo-Italian Cup: 1973

Liverpool
 Football League First Division: 1975–76, 1976–77, 1978–79, 1979–80, 1981–82
 Football League Cup: 1980–81, 1981–82
 FA Charity Shield: 1976, 1977 (shared), 1979, 1980
 European Cup: 1976–77, 1977–78, 1980–81
 UEFA Cup: 1975–76
 UEFA Super Cup: 1977

APOEL Nicosia
 Cypriot First Division: 1985–86
 Cypriot Super Cup: 1986

Individual
 First Division Goal of the Season: 1976–77
 PFA First Division Team of the Year: 1979–80
 PFA Players' Player of the Year: 1979–80
 FWA Footballer of the Year: 1979–80
 European Cup Top Scorer: 1980–81

References

Bibliography

External links
 
 
 Official Liverpool F.C. profile
 Profile at LFChistory.net
 Newcastle career, and links to other career sections, at Sporting-heroes.net

1951 births
APOEL FC players
Bury F.C. players
England international footballers
England under-23 international footballers
England under-21 international footballers
England B international footballers
English expatriate footballers
English footballers
Premier League managers
UEFA Euro 1980 players
1982 FIFA World Cup players
Association football midfielders
League of Ireland players
Cork City F.C. players
Liverpool F.C. players
Living people
English people of Irish descent
People from Kirkby
Newcastle United F.C. managers
Newcastle United F.C. players
English Football League players
Cypriot First Division players
Expatriate footballers in Cyprus
English expatriate sportspeople in Cyprus
Newcastle United F.C. non-playing staff
Celtic F.C. non-playing staff
Huddersfield Town A.F.C. non-playing staff
Birmingham City F.C. non-playing staff
UEFA Champions League winning players
UEFA Cup winning players
UEFA Champions League top scorers
Expatriate association footballers in the Republic of Ireland
English expatriate sportspeople in Ireland
English football managers
FA Cup Final players
People with dementia
Association football coaches